The 2021 Giro dell'Emilia was the 104th edition of the Giro dell'Emilia road cycling one day race in the titular region of central Italy. It was held on 2 October 2021 as part of the 2021 UCI Europe Tour and the 2021 UCI ProSeries calendars.

The race's hilly route covered  in and around Bologna, starting from Casalecchio di Reno and finishing at the Sanctuary of the Madonna of San Luca. The first  of the race consisted of a large circuit around Bologna and featured two sprint points in Zola Predosa and Valsamoggia, followed by three climbs (Ca' Bortolani, Passo Brasa, and Medelana) and a third sprint point at the Parco dei Ciliegi. After summiting the  San Luca hill, which had an average gradient of 9.4 percent, riders then took on four laps of a  circuit. Each lap began with a short descent from the sanctuary and a short climb to Montalbano, before a descent into Bologna and the climb back up to San Luca.

Teams 
14 of the 19 UCI WorldTeams, seven UCI ProTeams, and four UCI Continental teams made up the 25 teams that participated in the race. 14 teams entered a full squad of seven riders, while a further nine teams only entered six riders. In total, 162 riders started the race, of which only 55 finished.

UCI WorldTeams

 
 
 
 
 
 
 
 
 
 
 
 
 
 

UCI ProTeams

 
 
 
 
 
 
 

UCI Continental Teams

Result

References

Sources

External links 
  

Giro dell'Emilia
Giro dell'Emilia
Giro dell'Emilia
Giro dell'Emilia
Giro dell'Emilia